Ab Garmak-e Sofla (also Romanized as Āb Garmak-e Soflá; also known as Āb Garmak and Āb Garmak-e Pā‘īn) is a village in Sardarabad Rural District, in the Central District of Shushtar County, Khuzestan Province, Iran. At the 2006 census, its population was 1,225, with 237 families.

References 

Populated places in Shushtar County